The Old Grayson County Courthouse and Clerk's Office is a historic county courthouse located at Galax, Grayson County, Virginia.  The Old Grayson County Courthouse was built in 1834, and consists of a two-story central block with flanking two-story wings and a one-story addition on the rear north side which was built in the 1870s and expanded in 1988.  The Old clerk's Office, built in 1810, is a simple one-room brick structure. In 1850 the county seat moved to its present location in Independence, and the courthouse was subsequently used as a private residence, as a hotel, an apartment house, and a hay barn.

It was listed on the National Register of Historic Places in 1997.

References

Courthouses on the National Register of Historic Places in Virginia
Government buildings completed in 1834
Buildings and structures in Grayson County, Virginia
County courthouses in Virginia
National Register of Historic Places in Grayson County, Virginia